Pure is the fourth studio album by the Norwegian progressive metal band In the Woods... It is their first album since their 1999 album Strange in Stereo, and their first album without founding guitarist Oddvar A.M. who died on May 13, 2013, one year before the band reformed.

Track listing

References

2016 albums
In the Woods... albums